Miodrag Radanović (born 2 October 1947) is a Serbian football manager.

Career
Radanović served as manager of several Serbian SuperLiga and Serbian First League clubs, such as BSK Borča (two spells), Metalac Gornji Milanovac (November 2010–April 2011), Banat Zrenjanin (June–September 2012), Dinamo Vranje (September–October 2015), and OFK Beograd (November–December 2015). He also managed clubs in Russia, Bosnia and Herzegovina, Montenegro, and Albania.

Honours
Leotar
 First League of the Republika Srpska: 2001–02
 Republika Srpska Cup: 2001–02

References

External links
 
 

1947 births
Living people
Sportspeople from Belgrade
Serbia and Montenegro football managers
Serbian football managers
FC Rubin Kazan managers
FK Leotar managers
Red Star Belgrade non-playing staff
FK Lovćen managers
FK Rudar Pljevlja managers
FK BSK Borča managers
FK Metalac Gornji Milanovac managers
FK Banat Zrenjanin managers
OFK Beograd managers
Serbian SuperLiga managers
Kategoria Superiore managers
Serbia and Montenegro expatriate football managers
Serbian expatriate football managers
Expatriate football managers in Russia
Expatriate football managers in Bosnia and Herzegovina
Expatriate football managers in Montenegro
Expatriate football managers in Albania
Serbia and Montenegro expatriate sportspeople in Russia
Serbia and Montenegro expatriate sportspeople in Bosnia and Herzegovina
Serbian expatriate sportspeople in Montenegro
Serbian expatriate sportspeople in Albania